Abdul Khel is a town in the Federally Administered Tribal Areas of Pakistan. It is located at 33°54'46N 70°54'9E with an altitude of 1329 metres (4363 feet).

References

Populated places in Khyber Pakhtunkhwa